"Katy Too" is a song co-written and originally recorded by Johnny Cash.

The song was recorded by Cash at Sun Records on May 28, 1958, and released by Sun as a single (Sun 321, with "I Forgot to Remember to Forget" on the opposite side) in June 1959, when he had already left the label for Columbia.

Composition

Charts

References 

Johnny Cash songs
1959 singles
Songs written by Jack Clement
Songs written by Johnny Cash
Sun Records singles
1959 songs